Elvis Enmanuel Luciano (born February 15, 2000) is a Dominican professional baseball pitcher who is a free agent. He made his Major League Baseball (MLB) debut with the Toronto Blue Jays. He was the first player born in the 2000s to appear in an MLB game.

Professional career

Arizona Diamondbacks
Luciano was signed as an international free agent on October 1, 2016, by the Arizona Diamondbacks. He split this debut season of 2017 between the Rookie-level Dominican Summer League Diamondbacks and AZL Diamondbacks, and the Rookie Advanced Missoula Osprey. He posted a combined 4–1 record with a 2.84 ERA in 66 innings over 16 games (8 starts). Luciano opened the 2018 season in extended spring training.

Kansas City Royals
On June 6, 2018, the Arizona Diamondbacks traded Luciano and Gabe Speier to the Kansas City Royals for Jon Jay. He played for the Rookie Advanced Idaho Falls Chukars and Burlington Royals in 2018, combining to go 10–10 with a 3.90 ERA in 134 innings over 26 games (24 starts).

Toronto Blue Jays
The Blue Jays selected Luciano from the Royals organization in the 2018 Rule 5 draft. He was eligible because his first professional contract had been voided due to a medical issue. Luciano made the Blue Jays' 2019 Opening Day roster, becoming the first active major league player born in the 2000s. He made his major league debut on March 31, throwing 1 scoreless innings against the Detroit Tigers. In doing so Luciano became the youngest pitcher to appear in a game for the Blue Jays.

On April 28, 2019, Luciano earned his first major league win after recording the final out of the top of the 11th inning before the Blue Jays walked off the Oakland Athletics 5–4. On June 12, 2019, Luciano went on the 10-day injured list due to a right elbow sprain. On June 17, he was transferred to the 60-day injured list. He was activated from the injured list on September 12. Luciano did not make an appearance for the Blue Jays in 2020. 

Luciano made 11 starts for the Double-A New Hampshire Fisher Cats, going 0-1 with a 3.41 ERA and 33 strikeouts. On August 23, 2021, Luciano was released by the Blue Jays, and resigned to a new minor league contract on August 30.

In 2022, Luciano pitched only 3 innings over two starts for the Fisher Cats before being shut down for the rest of the season due to a stress fracture in his pitching arm. He elected free agency on November 10, 2022.

See also
Rule 5 draft results

References

External links

2000 births
Living people
People from Santo Domingo Province
Major League Baseball players from the Dominican Republic
Dominican Republic expatriate baseball players in the United States
Major League Baseball pitchers
Toronto Blue Jays players
Dominican Summer League Diamondbacks players
Arizona League Diamondbacks players
Missoula Osprey players
Idaho Falls Chukars players
Burlington Royals players
Tigres del Licey players
New Hampshire Fisher Cats players